The Montenegrin Women's Basketball Cup is the national women's basketball cup of Montenegro. It has been played for since 2006.

History

Before independence
Before Montenegrin independence, clubs from that Republic played in national basketball Cup of Yugoslavia / Serbia and Montenegro. Most successful was ŽKK Budućnost with two finals (2001–02, 2002–03).

After independence
Except Montenegrin Women's Basketball League as a top-tier league competition, after the independence, Basketball Federation of Montenegro established Montenegrin Cup as a second elite national tournament. The inaugural season of Montenegrin Cup was 2006-07, and since then all the titles have been won by ŽKK Budućnost and ŽKK Jedinstvo.

Winners and finals

Season by season
Below is a list of winners and finalists of Montenegrin Cup since the season 2006-07.

Sources:

Trophies by team

Montenegrin Cup
Below is a list of clubs with trophies won in Montenegrin Cup (2006-).

Overall
Below is an overall list, including participation in the finals of both national Cups - Montenegrin Cup and FR Yugoslavia / Serbia and Montenegro Cup.

See also
First A League of Montenegro
Montenegrin Basketball Cup (men)

References

Cup
Montenegro
Recurring sporting events established in 2006
2006 establishments in Montenegro
Basketball cup competitions in Montenegro